Bombay Hindi, also known as Bambaiya Hindi or Mumbaiya Hindi, is the Hindustani dialect spoken in Mumbai, in the Konkan region of India. Its vocabulary is largely from Hindi–Urdu, additionally, it has the predominant substratum of Marathi-Konkani, which is the official language and is also widely spoken in the Konkan division of Maharashtra. Bombay Hindi also has elements of Gujarati.

General
While many such local dialects have evolved in cosmopolitan cities around the world, Bombay Hindi is widely known throughout India, as a result of its frequent use in Bollywood movies. Initially, this dialect was used to represent crooks and uncouth characters as, to quote film critic Shoma A. Chatterji, "Indian films have the unique quality of different characters speaking different varieties of Hindi according to their social status, their caste, communal identity, education, profession, financial status, etc. [...] The villain's goons, speak in a special vulgarised, Bambaiya Hindi concocted specifically to typify such screen characters in Hindi cinema.". Lately, however, Bambaiya Hindi has become popular and prominent, particular with the success of the Munnabhai movies, in which the lead characters – being members of the Mumbai criminal underworld – speak entirely in this dialect.

Despite this increase in popularity, this dialect has its critics, and is sometimes seen as being disrespectful and demeaning.

Among the more prominent neologisms which originated in Bambaiya Hindi but have spread throughout India are the words bindaas (from Marathi bindhast = without fear, relaxed; this word was incorporated into the Oxford English Dictionary in 2005) and Gandhigiri (coined in the movie Lage Raho Munna Bhai, a combination of Gandhi and -giri, which is similar to the English 'ism' (as in Gandhi-ism), though slightly more informal).

Bollywood has also incorporated many Marathi words in Hindi like thaska, wakda, porgi, navri, navrai, kombdi, mulga/mulgi. Many Hindi songs have some Marathi words added.

Words and expressions of Mumbai Hindi

See also
 Tapori (word)

References

External links
Dialects of Hindi 
Metroblogging Mumbai Dictionary
Exhaustive List of Bambaiyya Hindi Words
List of Bambaiyya Idioms, Phrases and Expressions

Hindi languages
Languages of India
Culture of Mumbai
Indian slang
City colloquials
Hindustani-based pidgins and creoles